Alacrity may refer to:

 Alacrity (ship), various ships, including:
 Alacrity (1813 ship), a British merchant ship
 SS Alacrity (1893), a French tugboat used by the Royal Australian Navy during World War I
 HMS Alacrity, various Royal Navy ships
 USS Alacrity, several US Navy ships
 Operation Alacrity, a proposed World War II Allied occupation of the Azores in 1943

See also 
 Alacrity 19, a British trailerable sailboat designed by Peter Stevenson
 Diligence
 Enthusiasm
 Speed